Dixville Notch State Park is a park in northern New Hampshire, United States. The park encompasses  in Dixville Township where New Hampshire State Route 26 passes through Dixville Notch (New England's terminology for mountain gap or pass).

Within the park there are a scenic gorge, waterfalls on two mountain brooks, and hiking trails that lead to the summits of nearby mountains. While the park is accessible year-round, it is unstaffed and no visitor services are available.

Dixville Notch itself is characterized by a short steep-walled gorge that separates Dixville Peak and Cave Mountain, and also forms the boundary between the Connecticut River and Androscoggin River watersheds. Its beauty was already recognized in 1866, when innkeeper George Parsons established the Dix House, a travelers' guesthouse just west side of the notch on the shores of Lake Gloriette. Three decades later, the site was bought by Henry Hale who built The Balsams Grand Resort Hotel there.

References

External links

Dixville Notch State Park New Hampshire Department of Natural and Cultural Resources

State parks of New Hampshire
Parks in Coös County, New Hampshire
White Mountains (New Hampshire)